Agrius cordiae is a moth of the  family Sphingidae. It is known from the Marshall Islands.

The length of the forewings is 36 mm for males and 37 mm for females. It is similar to Agrius convolvuli, but smaller, darker and with a more complete pattern of transverse lines and bands on the forewing upperside. The sexual dimorphism is much less developed in this species (females are only slightly paler than males). There is a pair of pink subdorsal patches found on the upperside of the abdomen.

References

Agrius (moth)
Moths described in 1984
Moths of Oceania